Dyschirius vadoni is a species of ground beetle in the subfamily Scaritinae. It was described by Jeannel in 1946.

References

vadoni
Beetles described in 1946